Roquebrune is a commune in the department of Gironde, and the region of Nouvelle-Aquitaine (before 2015: Aquitaine), southwestern France.

Population

See also
Communes of the Gironde department

References

Communes of Gironde